The 1977 Seychelles coup d'état was a virtually bloodless coup that occurred in the East African and Indian Ocean country of Seychelles on 4–5 June 1977. Between 60–200 supporters of the Seychelles People's United Party (SPUP), who had been training in Tanzania, overthrew President Sir James Mancham of the Seychelles Democratic Party (SDP) whilst he was attending the Commonwealth Heads of Government Meeting in London, the United Kingdom.

The coup 
The insurgents took control of strategic points on the main island of Mahé, where the capital Victoria is located. The central police station was seized "virtually without a shot being fired." In contrast, there was an exchange of fire at the Mont Fleuri police station, where the arsenal was kept. A policeman and one of the insurgents were killed in the fighting.

The plotters arrested six British Armed Forces officers, who had been advising the Seychelles Police Force since 1976, when Seychelles gained independence from the United Kingdom. The officers and their families, as well as the Chief Justice of the Supreme Court, Aiden O'Brien Quinn, a judge from Ireland similarly on loan by his Government, were flown to Europe.

Aftermath 
The leader of the SPUP and Prime Minister France-Albert René, who denied knowing of the plan, was then sworn in as President and formed a new government.

When approached by the insurgents, René was said to have accepted the Presidency on three conditions: that the safety of political individuals be guaranteed, that international agreements remain in force (including the one allowing the United States to maintain an AFSCF space tracking station in Mahé), and that elections be planned for 1978 (they were eventually held in 1979).

See also 
 History of Seychelles
 1981 Seychelles coup d'état attempt

References 

Seychelles coup d'état
Coup d'état
Seychelles coup d'état
History of Seychelles
Military of Seychelles
Seychelles
June 1977 events in Africa
Battles involving Seychelles
Seychelles coup d'état
Cold War military history of Tanzania
1977 in Tanzania